Clavus hewittae is a species of sea snail, a marine gastropod mollusk in the family Drilliidae.

Description

Distribution
This marine species is endemic to Australia and occurs in the demersal zone off Western Australia.

References

 Wells, F.E. 1991. A revision of the Recent Australian species of the turrid genera Clavus, Plagiostropha, and Tylotiella (Mollusca: Gastropoda). Journal of the Malacological Society of Australasia 12: 1–33 
 Wilson, B. 1994. Australian Marine Shells. Prosobranch Gastropods. Kallaroo, WA : Odyssey Publishing Vol. 2 370 pp. 
 Tucker, J.K. 2004 Catalog of recent and fossil turrids (Mollusca: Gastropoda). Zootaxa 682:1–1295

External links

hewittae
Gastropods of Australia
Gastropods described in 1991